Campanula medium, common name Canterbury bells, is an annual or biennial flowering plant of the genus Campanula, belonging to the family Campanulaceae. In floriography, it represents gratitude, or faith and constancy.

Etymology
The specific epithet medium means that this plant has intermediate characteristics in respect of other species of the genus Campanula. In Persian, it is called  meaning "glass flower", because the flower resembles a drinking glass.

Description
This biennial herbaceous plant forms rosettes of leaves in the first year, stems and flowers in the second one. The stem is erect, robust, reddish-brown and bristly hairy. The upper leaves are smaller, lanceolate and sessile, almost embracing the stem.

The flowers are arranged in a racemose inflorescence of extremely long-lasting blooms. These attractive bell-shaped flowers are short-stalked, large and hermaphroditic, with different shades of violet-blue or rarely white. The corolla has five fused petals with lightly bent lobes (known as a coronate flower type).

The flowering period extends from May to July in the Northern Hemisphere. The flowers are either self-fertilized (autogamy) or pollinated by insects such as bees and butterflies (entomogamy). The seeds ripen from August to September and are dispersed by gravity alone (barochory).

Distribution
Campanula medium originates in southern Europe. It is naturalized in most of European countries and in North America and it is widely cultivated for its beautiful  flowers.

Habitat

Gardening
In gardens, they are best in massed planting in borders or among shrubs. It prefers cool or warm zones; not suitable for the tropics or hot, dry regions. Seeds take 14–21 days to germinate. The plant thrives in lightly shaded to sunny locations in well-drained soil. Canterbury bells grows nicely in flower beds, borders, and containers. Keep well watered.

Uses
This flower works well cut in floral arrangements. Beekeepers sometimes use the Canterbury Bell for making potently sweet honey.

Gallery

Cultivars 
Campanula medium 'Alba'
Campanula medium 'Bells of Holland'
Campanula medium 'Caerulea'
Campanula medium 'Calycanthema'
Campanula medium 'Champion Blue (dark flowers)
Campanula medium 'Champion lavender' (light purple flowers)
Campanula medium 'Champion Pink' (pink flowers)
Campanula medium 'Chelsea Pink' (pink flowers)
Campanula medium 'Muse Rose'
Campanula medium 'Rosea'
Campanula medium 'Russian Pink'

References

 
 Pignatti S. - Flora d'Italia – Edagricole – 1982, Vol. II, pag. 682

External links
 
 
, one of the Flowers of Loveliness for 1838 with an illustration (Canterbury Bell) by Louisa Sharpe combined with poetry by Letitia Elizabeth Landon.
 Biolib
 Plants
 Campanula medium

medium
Plants described in 1753
Taxa named by Carl Linnaeus